Leucanopsis nonagrioides is a moth of the family Erebidae. It was described by Walter Rothschild in 1910. It is found in Venezuela, Peru, Brazil and Paraguay.

References

External links

nonagrioides
Moths described in 1910